Richard Holman Hatch Jr. (born April 8, 1961) is an American former reality television contestant. In 2000, he became the first Survivor winner in its debut season, originally broadcast on CBS. He subsequently competed in All-Stars season of Survivor, the fourth celebrity edition of Celebrity Apprentice, and season 17 of The Biggest Loser. He was convicted with three counts related to attempted tax evasion and fraudulent tax return in January 2006. He served his fifty-one months and then, after failing to amend his 2000 and 2001 tax returns, additional nine months in prison.

Early life and education
Hatch's parents divorced when he was eleven years old. Also, at the time of Borneo, his mother was a registered nurse, and his father was a retired lab technician. Hatch is the oldest of four siblings.

Hatch graduated from Middletown High School (Rhode Island) in 1979. He studied oceanography and marine biology at the Florida Institute of Technology. He joined the United States Army in 1980 and became a West Point cadet within the next five years in the Army. He earned his bachelor's degree in Management and Applied Behavioral Sciences from the National Louis University. He pursued a master's degree by studying education and counseling at Rhode Island's Providence College.

After the Army, in 1985, Hatch moved to Manhattan and married an unidentified Australian woman. They had been estranged throughout most of their marriage that lasted for at least ten years.

Hatch's hometown is Newport, Rhode Island, where he resided at the time. He adopted a seven-year-old boy Christopher in 1998.

Survivor
TV Guide placed him thirty-first in its 2013 list of "The 60 Nastiest Villains of All Time" for his Survivor gameplay.

Survivor: Borneo
Hatch was a corporate trainer and consultant for his own business, Tri-Whale Training, when he first competed on Survivor. In Borneo (2000), he came out as gay onscreen, notoriously went nude on numerous occasions, and used resources to catch edible sea creatures underwater. Moreover, he defended, formed, and led an alliance with his remaining Tagi tribe members who seemed unable to win individually. Strategically, after the two tribes were merged into one, to ensure the all-Tagi competition, the Tagi alliance voted out every remaining member of the original Pagong tribe.

As four players remained, Hatch, Rudy Boesch, and Sue Hawk plotted to vote Wiglesworth out, but the idea was abandoned when Wiglesworth won an Individual Immunity challenge called "Fallen Comrades", a trivia quiz mini-game about eliminated contestants. At a Tribal Council, Hatch and Hawk received two votes each. In a tiebreaker, Hatch and Hawk were disallowed to vote; Boesch and Wiglesworth voted Hawk out and kept Hatch for the time being.

As one of three remaining players, Hatch strategically dropped out of the season's final Immunity challenge, leaving Boesch and Wiglesworth to compete each other. Wiglesworth beat Boesch in the challenge, (as the only player eligible to vote) voted Boesch out, and kept Hatch, hoping to beat him in the finals. Fourth-placed Sue Hawk infamously called Kelly a "rat" and Richard a "snake" in the final Council. Hawk further said that, in Mother Nature, snake would eat a rat.

Against the runner-up Wiglesworth, Hatch earned the "Sole Survivor" title and won $1 million and a Pontiac Aztek SUV by the 4–3 jury vote of the final Tribal Council. Three jury members of the Tagi tribe origins voted for Hatch. The other three jury members of the Pagong tribe origins voted for Kelly. Hatch earned a Pagong member Greg Buis's vote, totaling to four votes, because Hatch's number was closer to Buis's than Wiglesworth's was. Television critic Joel Reese of the Daily Herald credited Buis's "pick-a-number" strategy for Hatch's win more than Hatch's gameplay itself.

Survivor: All-Stars
Hatch re-competed in All-Star (2004) as part of the Mogo Mogo tribe. As before, he caught edible sea creatures with available resources. Mogo Mogo became weary about his antics, attitude, and constant nudity. Thus, he became the fourth person of the season and the first member of the tribe voted out, placing fourteenth.

Before his elimination, Hatch was involved in an incident with another former Borneo player Sue Hawk, who reappeared in the same season as part of the Chapera tribe. Hawk later claimed that, during one of tribal immunity challenges, which was a balance beam mini-game, Hatch's genitals touched her as he passed her by on the course. The next day, Hawk resigned from the game voluntarily as she was too upset to continue. Hatch and Hawk discussed the incident in the February 27, 2004, episode of The Early Show, the following day after the Survivor episode aired the incident.

Other appearances
In post-Borneo era, Hatch made guest appearances as himself on "One Wong Move" (2000) from Becker and, alongside Sue Hawk, "Penetration Island" (2002) from Son of the Beach. In Becker, Hatch visits the titular character's office for his severe stomachache and makes references to his Survivor gameplay, like eating bizarre things.

Hatch also wrote his 2000 book 101 Survival Secrets: How to Make $1 Million, Lose 100 pounds and Live Happily Ever After. According to a November 2000 interview, he lost more than 100 pounds within the past two years up to Borneo and then, after the filming was completed, having his excess inelastic tissue removed from his abdomen via resection surgery on May 9, 2000.

Hatch appeared alongside three other Survivor players—Hawk, Jenna Lewis and Gervase Peterson—in Hollywood Squares on the week of September 25, 2000.

In the Australian version of Who Wants to Be a Millionaire? in October 2000, Hatch incorrectly answered the fourth question "What is 11 × 12?", resulting in his elimination without winning money. He also competed against other five Borneo players in the May 10, 2001, episode of Weakest Link. Despite correctly answering most questions, he was unanimously voted out as the "weakest link" in the first round.

Hatch also competed in the July 15, 2002, episode (all-reality edition) of a game show Dog Eat Dog. He became part of a "dog pound" team after losing a challenge. The team lost the $25,000 prize to Borneo player Sue Hawk.

In post-All-Stars era, Hatch also competed in the Survivor edition of Family Feud, aired on the week of February 14, 2005, alongside other Survivor players, including Rudy Boesch and Sue Hawk, who were divided into male and female teams. He also competed on Battle of the Network Reality Stars in 2005 as part of the "dark blue" team, which lost the $10,000 prize to the "light blue" team in the finals. He also was "fired" in the April 3, 2011, episode of The Celebrity Apprentice 4. He also was eliminated in the January 18, 2016, episode of the 17th season of The Biggest Loser for not losing enough weight.

Acquittals and convictions
Hatch was convicted in a county district court in September 2001 with domestic assault charge one month after his former partner Glenn Boyanowski accused him of assault. Hatch said that the assault started when Boyanowski trespassed his Middletown house. Hatch was sentenced to one-year probation on September 24, 2001, and was ordered not to contact Boyanowski. He appealed his conviction and sentence, both of which were overturned in a county superior court on February 5, 2002, after two days of court hearings.

Hatch was convicted also on January 25, 2006, by jury with two counts of attempted tax evasion and one count of signing a fraudulent tax return for not paying taxes amounting to about $1.4 million, which were based on his past Survivor winnings, his $321,000 earnings as a co-host of a Boston radio show, and $28,000 rental property. According to investigation, he hired two different accountants in 2001 and 2002 to prepare his tax returns that would have reflected his Survivor winnings. Rather than file either return, he filed a return that did not reflect the winnings. He plead guilty to two of those counts before the conviction. He served his 51-month sentence in federal prison, particularly Federal Correctional Institution, Morgantown, and his release was under three-year supervision.

In 2010, one year after Hatch's release in 2009, Survivor host/producer Jeff Probst and producer Mark Burnett revealed that Hatch was a strong candidate to reappear for the twentieth season, Survivor: Heroes vs. Villains, as a villain. However, Hatch was still under house arrest at the time and unable to re-participate because prosecutors denied him permission to do so. Hatch served an additional nine months in prison from March to December 2011 for not amending his 2000 and 2001 tax returns. The additional sentence prevented him from appearing in the live finale of The Celebrity Apprentice 4. Since then, his release had been under supervision again, making him unable to leave the country, for 26 remaining months.

Also in January 2006, Hatch was acquitted from seven fraud charges related to Horizon Bound, a charity to provide outdoor activity for troubled youth. However, the charity donations were also part of an investigation related to tax evasion charges.

Personal life
After the All-Stars filming, Hatch dated an Argentine tourist director Emiliano Cabral, whose age was twenty-eight in early  2004. They legally married in Nova Scotia in 2005. They divorced in a Rhode Island family court after at least fourteen years of their relationship.

According to Inside Edition, while he attended George Mason University (Virginia), Hatch donated his sperm to a sperm bank in Fairfax, Virginia, hundreds of times total for two years, twice or thrice per week average, to earn $30 per donation. Accordingly, two different women who were donated Hatch's sperm eventually gave birth to, respectively, one daughter and one son. He met his two biological children, both age twenty-two at the time, for the first time in 2011.

A property purchased by Hatch in Sydney, Nova Scotia, following his Survivor win was included in a tax sale during a public auction in 2013. As the Cape Breton Regional Municipality tax office indicated, Hatch had not paid property taxes on the property for a period of more than six years.

Filmography

References
Notes

Sources

Further reading

External links
 
 Richard Hatch biography for Survivor: All-Stars at CBS.com
 Hatch's criminal indictment on The Smoking Gun

1961 births
21st-century American criminals
American LGBT military personnel
American people convicted of tax crimes
Contestants on Australian game shows
LGBT people from Rhode Island
Living people
National Louis University alumni
People from Newport, Rhode Island
Survivor (American TV series) winners
United States Army soldiers
Gay military personnel
Participants in American reality television series
The Apprentice (franchise) contestants
Winners in the Survivor franchise